Adolfo Baines Pilart (born 15 February 1972) is a Spanish former professional footballer who played as a goalkeeper, who is currently in charge of CF Pobla de Mafumet.

Club career
Born in Isaba, Navarre, Baines was in CD Logroñés' roster from 1995 to 1997, being part of the team that competed in La Liga in the latter season but appearing in no league games. He started his active professional career in the third division, with Getafe CF and Gimnàstic de Tarragona. In 2000 he moved to CD Badajoz in the second level, being a starter throughout his entire spell and not being able to prevent relegation in his last campaign.

In January 2004, after an unassuming stint in the lower leagues of Portugal, Baines returned to his country and signed with another second-tier side, agreeing to a two-and-a-half-year contract with CD Tenerife. He only managed to be a backup during his tenure in the Canary Islands, totalling just five matches.

Subsequently, Baines joined Milton Keynes Dons of the English Fourth Division on a free transfer. He had a stormy start to the season as he was sent off in his first league game after handling the ball outside the area in a 2–1 win against Bury; he was soon dropped to the bench when Lee Harper was brought on loan from Northampton Town.

After having spent the majority of his spell on the club's transfer list, Baines was released by Milton Keynes in May 2007. In 2011, he returned to his former team Gimnàstic as a goalkeeper coach.

Managerial statistics

References

External links

1972 births
Living people
People from Roncal-Salazar
Spanish people of English descent
Spanish footballers
Footballers from Navarre
Association football goalkeepers
Segunda División players
Segunda División B players
Tercera División players
CA Osasuna B players
SD Huesca footballers
CD Logroñés footballers
Getafe CF footballers
Gimnàstic de Tarragona footballers
CD Badajoz players
CD Tenerife players
Leixões S.C. players
English Football League players
Milton Keynes Dons F.C. players
Spanish expatriate footballers
Expatriate footballers in Portugal
Expatriate footballers in England
Spanish expatriate sportspeople in Portugal
Spanish expatriate sportspeople in England